Lycée Romain Rolland is a senior high school in Goussainville, Val-d'Oise, France, in the Paris metropolitan area.

References

External links
 Lycée Romain Rolland 

Lycées in Val-d'Oise